The canton of Marcq-en-Barœul was a former French canton, located in the Nord department in the Nord-Pas-de-Calais region. It had 49,428 inhabitants (2012).

Composition 
The canton of Marcq-en-Barœul included the following municipalities:

History

See also 

 Cantons of Nord
 Communes of Nord

References 

Former cantons of Nord (French department)